The  Duluth Superior Area Community Foundation (DSACF) is a grant-making organization located in Duluth, Minnesota, United States. DSACF promotes private giving for the public good. DSACF serves seven counties in NE Minnesota (Aitkin, Carlton, Cook, Itasca, Koochiching, Lake and St. Louis) and NW Wisconsin (Ashland, Douglas and Bayfield). DSACF holds $50 million in assets, has 300 charitable funds and has awarded $37 million in grants and scholarships.

Grants and scholarships
DSACF has worked with individuals, families, private foundations, and companies to provide thousands of grants totaling millions of dollars for nonprofits and area students to enhance the quality of life in this region.

DSACF supports activities in five basic areas including:
Arts
Community and Economic Development
Education
Environment
Human Services

Initiatives
DSACF serves the community as grant makers and community leaders. DSACF works with community stakeholders to find solutions to issues that  help maintain a vibrant community.

DSACF Initiatives include:
 Knight Creative Communities Initiative
Attracting & Retaining Young Adults
Young Leaders Fund
TwinPortsConnex
20 Under 40
Scott Anderson Leadership
Social Capital Benchmark
Speak Your Peace: The Civility Project

References

External links
Official website

Duluth, Minnesota
Non-profit organizations based in Minnesota
Community foundations based in the United States